Karey may refer to:

People
 Karey Dornetto (fl. 2002–present), American screenwriter
 Karey Hanks (fl. 2016–2018), American politician
 Karey Kirkpatrick (fl. 1996–present), American screenwriter
 Karey Lee Woolsey (born 1976), American singer-songwriter

Languages
 Karey language, spoken on the Aru Islands of eastern Indonesia

See also

 Carey (disambiguation)
 Kare (disambiguation) 
 Kareh (disambiguation)
 Kary (disambiguation)